The 1901 Cleveland mayoral election saw the election of Tom L. Johnson by a very large margin. Johnson ran on a pro-municipal ownership and tax reform platform.

References

Mayoral elections in Cleveland
Cleveland mayoral
Cleveland
1900s in Cleveland